Skrzyński (feminine: Skrzyńska; plural: Skrzyńscy) is a Polish-language surname literally meaning "from Skrzyńsko". Notable people with this surname include:
Aleksander Skrzyński (1882–1931), Polish politician
Łukasz Skrzyński (born 1978), Polish footballer
 (born 1988) Polish singer-songwriter 
 (1893–1972), brigadier general of the Polish Armed Forces, known as one of the Seven Lancers of Belina

See also
 

Polish-language surnames